Daniells is a surname. Notable people with the surname include:

A. G. Daniells (1858–1935), American Seventh-day Adventist minister and administrator
Roy Daniells (1902–1979), Canadian poetry professor

See also
Danielle
Daniels (disambiguation)